The Spice Route Paarl is a popular tourist destination located in the city of Paarl, South Africa. Make sure to check in with vendors regarding specific operating hours. The farm is open 7 days a week but each vendor adheres to their own operating hours. The name Spice Route dates back to the historical mariners who used to trade Eastern spices to Europe along the "Spice Route" for spice trade in the 15th century. The Estate gives visitors the opportunity to explore local foods, beverages and goods, that are produced in a traditional manner supporting the local community while spreading the taste and spirit of South Africa out to the world. Its cellar production and wine tasting is conducted of red and white wines from the local Malmesbury and Darling wine yards, which received national and international attention.

History 

Charles Back, the owner of the estate as well as of Fairview, initiated his project Spice Route in 1997. His vision was "to offer local and international tourists a selection of hand-picked artisanal producers who put as much thought, skill and passion into their products as Spice Route wine maker, Charl du Plessis, puts into his wines".

Location and tourism 

The Spice Route is located at the Seidelberg Wine Estate. It is a 40 minutes drive from Cape Town and 800 meters away from Fairview Wine and Cheese Estate. The GPS coordinates are: S 33° 45’ 50.00 and E 18° 55’ 10.00.

Distances

 Cape Town: 58 km
 Stellenbosch: 25 km
 Worcester: 61 km

Components of the Spice Route 

Visitors can go on a journey on that traditional route, which takes them to the following 11 destinations to explore the culture, art and taste of South Africa:

Wine Tasting 
Cape Brewing Co.
DV Artisan Chocolate
Barley & Biltong
Richard Bosman
The Trading company
The Barn Artist`s
Red Hot Glass
DV Cottage Café
La Grapperia
Sirenia Diamonds

See also 

Route 62 
Route 44
Wine tasting 
Enotourism
South African wine

References

External links 

 Paarl wine route
 Wines of South Africa (WOSA) industry body

Spice Route
South African cuisine
Tourist attractions in the Western Cape
Paarl